Jinjett Wattanasin (also known as Jaonaay, born 28 June 2001) is a Thai actor and singer.

Early life and education 
Jinjett was born to singer Jetrin Wattanasin and actress . He is their eldest child along with his siblings namely  and Jakara Wattanasin. He completed his elementary education at Ascot International School, his secondary education at Millfield School in Somerset, England and is currently taking up a bachelor's degree in music production at the British and Irish Modern Music Institute in London.

He grew up with music as he started playing drums at the age of 8 and later on with the keyboard and guitar. At age 11, he joined his siblings as they performed during their father's 20th anniversary concert in 2012. He was sent by his parents to study in a boarding school in England and started studying on year ten at Millfield School.

Career 
He started his singing career at the age of 16 under Jaymidi, a recording label owned by his father and debuted as its first artist with the song "คนละชั้น" (Kon La Chun) which its music video was shot in Krabi. When asked about its similarity with Justin Bieber's music videos, Jinjett admitted that he considers him as an inspiration being one of his fans. The song became an instant hit as it reached one million views on YouTube overnight and currently has more than one hundred million views. It also won as Song of the Year in the 2018 Nine Entertainment Awards. He later released several singles such as "แอบบอกรัก" (Aep Bok Rak), "ดึกแล้วอย่าเพิ่งกลับ" (Deuk Laeo Aya Phoeng Klap) and "เธอมีเขา" (Thoe Mi Khao).

His first venture into acting was when he was tapped to play the role of Bank in Bad Genius: The Series, a 2020 television adaptation of the 2017 film Bad Genius directed by Nattawut Poonpiriya. While Jinjett did not have any acting background unlike his co-lead actors and actresses, he got the help of the television series' director Pat Boonnitipat in honing his acting skills given the relevance of his character in the series. He also composed and sang "โกงรักไม่ได้" (Kong Rak Mai Dai), one the series' original soundtrack.

Filmography

Television

Discography

Awards and nominations

Personal life 
Jinjett has a half-sister named Jidarin Na Lamliang, his father's daughter with Miss Thailand 1992 1st runner-up Jidapa Na Lamliang (Gina). He is also the nephew of singer  (Joe), lead vocalist of the band .

References

External links 
 
 

2001 births
Living people
Jinjett Wattanasin
Jinjett Wattanasin
Jinjett Wattanasin
Jinjett Wattanasin
People educated at Millfield